Holosticha antarctica is a species of littoral ciliates, first found near King George Island.

References

Further reading
Li, Liqiong, et al. "A redescription of the marine hypotrichous ciliate, Nothoholosticha fasciola (Kahl, 1932) nov. gen., nov. comb.(Ciliophora: Urostylida) with brief notes on its cellular reorganization and SS rRNA gene sequence." European journal of protistology 45.3 (2009): 237–248.
Gong, Jun, et al. "Morphology and infraciliature of Holosticha bradburyae nov. spec.(Ciliophora, Hypotrichida) from the Yellow Sea, China."Hydrobiologia 464.1-3 (2001): 63–69.

External links

Species described in 2008
Hypotrichea